Myles McKeon (3 April 1919 – 2 May 2016) was an Irish-born Australian bishop who was the Roman Catholic Bishop of Bunbury.

Career 
McKeon was born in Drummin, Ireland and educated at St Jarlath's College, Tuam. He attended University College Dublin and studied for the priesthood All Hallows College Dublin. At All Hallows he was ordained priest for the diocese of Perth, Western Australia, on 22 June 1947 by Bishop Henry Vincent Marshall of Salford. On 23 May 1962 he was appointed an Auxiliary Bishop of Perth as well as Titular Bishop of Antipyrgos. He was consecrated as a bishop by Bishop Lancelot Goody. In March 1969 he was appointed Bishop of Bunbury. On 18 February 1982, aged 62, he resigned as Bishop of Bunbury.

References

External links
Catholic Hierarchy website

1919 births
2016 deaths
Irish emigrants to Australia
Religious leaders from County Mayo 
People from Perth, Western Australia
20th-century Roman Catholic bishops in Australia
Roman Catholic bishops of Bunbury
Irish expatriate Catholic bishops
Alumni of All Hallows College, Dublin
Alumni of University College Dublin